HBO Asia is the Asian division of HBO, based out of Singapore. It was originally launched on 1 May 1992 as MovieVision, later rebranding on 1 June 1995 to its current name after being purchased by Home Box Office, Inc. The Singapore-based broadcast network offers channels and services with no advertisements– HBO, HBO Signature, HBO Family, HBO Hits, Cinemax and Red – as well as HBO Go and HBO on Demand. HBO Asia is also the exclusive distributor of BabyFirst in Asia.

Programming
HBO Asia has licensing deals with two major Hollywood conglomerate film studios: Warner Bros. Discovery (Warner Bros. Pictures; New Line Cinema, HBO Films, Castle Rock Entertainment; Warner Independent Pictures) and Paramount Global (Paramount Pictures, Paramount Vantage).
 HBO Central is a monthly program giving information about which movies and series will be shown in the coming month.
 New seasons of HBO's Original Series or Original Productions air on Sunday nights/Monday mornings.

Original Programming

HBO also aired their Original Series or Original Films from Asian creators which aired on Sunday nights. Some other Asian original title may also simultaneously release in other platform, for example Catchplay, which has co-produce some HBO Asian titles.

TV series

Drama

Comedy

Unscripted

Co-productions
These shows have been commissioned by HBO Asia with a partner network.

Films

Censorship
HBO Asia was heavily censored in some Asian countries, with many series such as Sex and the City, The Sopranos, Entourage, The Wire, Hung, Girls, True Blood, Game of Thrones, Boardwalk Empire, True Detective, Westworld, Insecure, Succession, Euphoria, I May Destroy You, Perry Mason, Lovecraft Country, Industry, The White Lotus, House of the Dragon, and The Last of Us aired in edited versions; certain programmes are not shown in some territories at all. This has been liberalised to an extent in recent years.

The HBO-made series Entourage was taken off-air for three weeks by one cable operator in the Philippines, pending clearance by the MTRCB. The entire series continued to air without disruption on all other Philippines cable operators.

In Vietnam, every movie with content which is considered to oppose or distort the American War, the Communist Party of Vietnam or Communism in general is replaced by another film. In addition, if the Ministry of Culture and Information considers a movie has contents of a serious sexual or horrific nature not conforming with Vietnamese society, it will not be aired.

Output that feature visuals such as the middle finger, nudity, passionate intimacy and vulgar language are cut out.

In China, due to Western product restrictions, and the China-United States trade war, HBO was blocked and restricted, and the replacement is currently Tencent Video and iQIYI.

Channels

HBO South Asia

HBO formerly provided a separate feed with commercial breaks for audiences in South Asia, namely India, Bangladesh, and the Maldives. All movie promos in this beam are according to IST. A timeshifted feed for Pakistan was launched in the mid-2000s in partnership with ARY Digital Network. The schedule was same as the Indian feed with the difference being the commercial breaks and timings in PST.

Before the launch of HBO South Asia, HBO tried replicating the premium model in India. But then HBO decided it wasn't commercially viable so the South Asia channel was launched in India and also in Bangladesh, Pakistan and Maldives.

HBO Asia and Eros International launched HBO Defined and HBO Hits across India on 21 February 2013 on Dish TV and Airtel Digital TV. These channels are commercial-free. The content of both the channels include movies as well as most of HBO Original Programming. When the channels launched, the main HBO channel stopped airing original series.

In 2015, HBO had decided to exit the Indian market and license the channel to Turner International India. The channel was revamped in February 2016 after a survey conducted by the channel team to better suit the masses. HBO Defined and HBO Hits would be handled by Star India, however HBO Defined and HBO Hits SD was shut down on 31 December 2015 while HBO Hits HD was replaced by HBO HD on 4 September 2016. It only airs Hollywood movies, as Star India has the rights to HBO Original Programming which are available on Star World and Disney+ Hotstar.

WarnerMedia International announced on 15 October 2020 that HBO South Asia and WB Channel would close down on 15 December 2020. The HBO channel would no longer be available in India and Pakistan after this date, while WB Channel ceased to exist in India, Bangladesh, Pakistan and the Maldives.

HBO India had closed down at midnight with the last movie on the SD channel being Mad Max: Fury Road (completed 1 hour before the shutdown) and the last movie on the HD channel being Memoirs of a Geisha. HBO Pakistan was also closed down at midnight.

See also
 HBO
 Cinemax

Notes

References

External links
  (Archive)
 
 
 

Asia
HBO Asia
Movie channels
Cable television in Hong Kong
English-language television stations
Television channels and stations established in 1992
Television stations in Mumbai
Defunct television channels in India
Warner Bros. Discovery Asia-Pacific
Movie channels in the Philippines
Movie channels in Singapore
Movie channels in Taiwan
Movie channels in Thailand
Movie channels in Indonesia
Movie channels in Vietnam
Movie channels in Malaysia
Movie channels in South Korea
Mass media in Southeast Asia
1992 establishments in Singapore

th:เอชบีโอ